Aquilon is a name derived from Aquilo, the Latin term for the north-east wind.

Aquilon may also refer to:

Ships
HMS Aquilon
HMS Aquilon (1758)
Spanish ship Aquilon (1754)
French ship Aquilon
French ship Aquilon (1789)

Other uses
L'Aquilon, a Canadian weekly newspaper
SNCASE Aquilon, a series of aircraft produced by the French manufacturer SNCASE.
The trademark of KOSEKI Aquila Raphael, the Japanese theatre and film producer
The poem Les Aquilons (The North Winds), by the French poet Joseph Autran.
Les Aquilons, part 2 of the choral work Les quatre élémens by Franz Liszt, based on Autran's poem
The character Aquilon in the mythological novels of Rick Riordan.
The 3rd generation CMDB component of the Quattor project.